The Riverside Public Library system serves the city of Riverside, California. The main library is located adjacent to the historic Mission Inn in downtown Riverside.  Seven other branches are located throughout the city.

History 
On  July 9, 1888, the Riverside City Board of Trustees assumed responsibility for the book collection of The Riverside Library Association, was formed in 1879; the City took responsibility for the collection in 1888, and appointed a committee to oversee the establishment of a public library. The Riverside Public Library opened on June 1, 1889, in two upstairs rooms in the Handy Building, located on the north side of Eighth Street, between Main and Orange streets. In January 1890, the collection was moved to the second floor of the Loring Building.

On August 16, 1901, Andrew Carnegie granted Riverside $20,000 for a library building with a capacity of 20,000 volumes. Construction began in 1902, and the result was a Mission Revival building—the work of the architectural firm of Burnham and Blieser—on the northeast corner of Seventh and Orange streets. It opened to the public on 31 July 1903, it had a 20,000-volume capacity. In mid-1909, the library was expanded with another Carnegie grant—a $15,000 project that created a children's room for the first time. Further expansions saw a Reference Wing, designed by Riverside architect G. Stanley Wilson, and the purchase use of two adjacent house.

In 1961, the city voters approved a $1.7 million bond issue to construct a new downtown library building. The new library was open to the public in 1964. It has , with a 300,000 volume capacity and seating for 550 patrons; design was by the Riverside architectural firm of Moise, Harbach and Hewlett.

In October, 2009, the library's board of trustees reinitiated plans to replace the existing main library. Previous plans were scrapped after the public expressed displeasure with the approach that had been taken.

Library Service School
Joseph F. Daniels, a lecturer and guest professor founded a library school in 1911, taught by himself and some library experts from other parts of the country. It began with basic classes and training projects for the library's own staff and soon after  for non-staff member. The School closed in 1943.

Inlandia Institute
The Riverside Public Library created the Inlandia Institute in collaboration with Heyday Books in 2009. Its mission "is to recognize, support and expand literary activity in the Inland Empire, thereby deepening people’s awareness, understanding, and appreciation of this unique, complex and creatively vibrant area."

Marion Mitchell-Wilson, who was the Riverside Public Library's Development Officer, served as the Inlandia Institute's Executive Director from its inception until 2012 when she stepped down due to health reasons.

Branches
Main Library, 3581 Mission Inn Ave
Arlanza, 8267 Philbin Ave
Arlington, 9556 Magnolia Ave
Casa Blanca, 2985 Madison Ave
Eastside, 4033-C Chicago Ave
La Sierra, 4600 La Sierra Ave
Marcy, 6927 Magnolia Ave
Orange Terrace, 20010-A Orange Terrace Pky

Vision Statement of Library 
"To be the foremost promoter of self-directed life-long learning. We spark curiosity and provide tools for discovery."

Library Directors
Mary Montague Smith 1888-1900
Grace Mansfield 1900-1905
Margaret Kyle 1905-1909
Helen Evans (Acting) 1909-1910
Joseph F. Daniels 1910-1921
Lillian Dickson (Acting) 1921-1922
Charles F. Woods 1922-1947
Albert Charles Lake 1947-1975
Catherine Lucas 1975-1979
Linda M. Wood 1980-1991
Judith Auth 1991-2005
Barbara Custen 2005-2008
Leonard Hernandez, 2008-2010
Tonya Kennon, 2011-2018
Erin Christmas, 2018-Current

Board of Library Trustees

The City Council appoints nine residents to serve up to two four-year terms as trustees of the Library.

Sources
 Baker, Ronald J.; Serving Through Partnership: A Centennial History of the Riverside City and County Public Library, 1888-1988

References 

9. Take a first look at Riverside's "striking" new $40 Million downtown library

10. Design OK'd for downtown Riverside's new $40-million library

11. Old bus station to become a modern $39 million library in Riverside

External links
Riverside Public Library
City of Riverside
RPL Online Catalog
Official Facebook Page

Public libraries in California
Government agencies established in 1879
Carnegie libraries in California
Libraries in Riverside County, California
Link+ libraries
Organizations based in Riverside, California
Education in Riverside, California
Government in Riverside, California
Library buildings completed in 1903
1879 establishments in California